Thailand competed in the Summer Olympic Games for the first time at the 1952 Summer Olympics in Helsinki, Finland. It sent a delegation of eleven athletes, who competed only in the men's track-and-field event.

The eight competitors (with three substitutes in addition) were: Adul Wanasatith, Boonterm Pakpuang, Arun Sankosik, Pongummart Ummarttayakul, Sompop Svadanandana, Boonpak Kwancharoen, Satid Leangtanom, and Kamtorn Sanidwong.

References

Nations at the 1952 Summer Olympics
1952 Summer Olympics
1952 in Thai sport